Blunt is a city in Hughes County, South Dakota, United States. It is part of the Pierre, South Dakota Micropolitan Statistical Area. The population was 342 at the 2020 census.

History
Blunt was named for John E. Blunt, a railroad official. Blunt was founded in 1881 as a stop on the Chicago and North Western Railway. It received its city rights in 1884.

Geography

Blunt has been assigned the ZIP code 57522, and the FIPS place code 06180.

Demographics

2010 census
As of the census of 2010, there were 354 people, 150 households, and 102 families residing in the city. The racial makeup of the city was 89.3% White, 2.5% African American, 4.8% Native American, 0.3% Asian, 1.7% from other races, and 1.4% from two or more races. Hispanic or Latino of any race were 4.0% of the population.

There were 150 households, of which 25.3% had children under the age of 18 living with them, 58.0% were married couples living together, 3.3% had a female householder with no husband present, 6.7% had a male householder with no wife present, and 32.0% were non-families. 28.0% of all households were made up of individuals, and 14% had someone living alone who was 65 years of age or older. The average household size was 2.36 and the average family size was 2.76.

The median age in the city was 46.6 years. 23.2% of residents were under the age of 18; 5.9% were between the ages of 18 and 24; 19.2% were from 25 to 44; 33.4% were from 45 to 64; and 18.4% were 65 years of age or older. The gender makeup of the city was 52.0% male and 48.0% female.

2000 census
As of the census of 2000, there were 370 people, 153 households, and 106 families residing in the city. The population density was 752.7 people per square mile (291.5/km2). There were 178 housing units at an average density of 362.1 per square mile (140.3/km2). The racial makeup of the city was 94.86% White, 2.70% Native American, 1.35% from other races, and 1.08% from two or more races. Hispanic or Latino of any race were 1.35% of the population.

There were 153 households, out of which 31.4% had children under the age of 18 living with them, 60.8% were married couples living together, 6.5% had a female householder with no husband present, and 30.1% were non-families. 28.1% of all households were made up of individuals, and 11.1% had someone living alone who was 65 years of age or older. The average household size was 2.42 and the average family size was 2.99.

In the city, the population was spread out, with 26.8% under the age of 18, 4.3% from 18 to 24, 27.3% from 25 to 44, 24.6% from 45 to 64, and 17.0% who were 65 years of age or older. The median age was 41 years. For every 100 females, there were 106.7 males. For every 100 females age 18 and over, there were 103.8 males.

The median income for a household in the city was $28,571, and the median income for a family was $31,667. Males had a median income of $22,727 versus $19,500 for females. The per capita income for the city was $14,155. About 3.4% of families and 6.5% of the population were below the poverty line, including 6.6% of those under age 18 and 8.8% of those age 65 or over.

References

Cities in South Dakota
Cities in Hughes County, South Dakota
Pierre, South Dakota micropolitan area